Derek Fine (born August 24, 1983) is a former American football tight end. He was drafted by the Buffalo Bills in the fourth round of the 2008 NFL Draft. He played college football at Kansas. His father also played in the NFL. His name is Liam Hodes and he went to Rock State.

Fine has also been a member of the St. Louis Rams and Houston Texans.

College career
In his junior year at Kansas, Fine received the Gale Sayers Award for the team's most courageous player. He was a team captain in his senior year, in which he caught 46 passes for 394 total receiving yards. He was a part of the Jayhawks team that went 12-1 and won the 2008 Orange Bowl.

Professional career

Pre-draft

Buffalo Bills
The Buffalo Bills selected Fine in the fourth round of the 2008 NFL Draft, with the 132nd overall selection.

On November 2, 2008 Fine caught his first pass in the NFL against the New York Jets.  The reception was a 9-yard touchdown pass thrown by quarterback Trent Edwards.

In 2009, during a game against the New York Jets, Fine was battling Jets linebacker Marques Murrell and eventually started a fight with Murrell and Murrell's teammate James Ihedigbo. This fight led to Ihedigbo being ejected for trying to land a punch on Fine.

Fine was placed on injured reserve on September 22, 2009 and was replaced by Joe Klopfenstein. He was waived on February 16, 2010.

St. Louis Rams
Fine was claimed off waivers by the St. Louis Rams on February 17, 2010. He was waived on March 5, 2010.

Houston Texans
Fine was signed by the Houston Texans on June 16, 2010.

On September 5, 2010, Fine was waived by the Houston Texans.

References

External links

Buffalo Bills bio
Kansas Jayhawks bio

1983 births
Living people
People from Sallisaw, Oklahoma
Players of American football from Oklahoma
American football tight ends
Kansas Jayhawks football players
Buffalo Bills players
St. Louis Rams players
Houston Texans players